The following is a list of episodes of the British sketch comedy series French and Saunders, which was first broadcast on BBC Two on 9 March 1987. The series, written by and starring comedy duo and namesake Dawn French and Jennifer Saunders, lasted for six series and nine specials, airing a total of 48 episodes between 1987 and 2005. Several compilation episodes were also broadcast: the 1995 two-part special, "French and Saunders Go To the Movies"; the six-part 2007 series, "A Bucket o' French and Saunders", which marked the 20th anniversary of the series; and "300 Years of French and Saunders", which was screened on 25 December 2017 to mark the 30th anniversary of the series.

Series overview

Episodes

Series 1 (1987)

Series 2 (1988)

Christmas Special (1988)

Series 3 (1990)

Series 4 (1993)

Christmas Special (1994)
With this episode, French and Saunders moves from BBC Two to BBC One.

Series 5 (1996)

Specials (1998–2003)

Series 6 (2004)

Christmas Special (2005)

Compilation specials

French and Saunders Go to the Movies (1995)

Music Specials (2005)

A Bucket o' French and Saunders (2007)
A Bucket O' French and Saunders was shown from 7 September till 5 October (the sixth episode not being shown). The series was shown as a retrospective, showing 20 years of the French and Saunders sketch show. The older material was interspersed with new sketches, which had been recorded in June 2007 at BBC Television Centre. New material included parodies of America's Next Top Model, The Apprentice, Gordon Ramsay's The F-Word, The Academy Awards (featuring a cameo appearance by Dame Helen Mirren), X Factor, Big Brother, Fame Academy and a parody of disgraced celebrities Amy Winehouse and Britney Spears.

300 Years of French and Saunders (2017)

Other appearances
Alison Moyet – Love Letters (promo video – F&S appearance) (1987)
Jim Henson's The Storyteller – the bad sisters in Sapsorrow (1988)
Hysteria 2 (live appearance C4 (Tiger Television), Standup/sketch, colour (1989)
The Secret Policeman's Biggest Ball – ITV (Central), Standup/sketch (1989)
Little Pig Robinson (Beatrix Potter) (1990)
French and Saunders Live! (1990 Tour) Home video release (non-BBC) (1990)
Hysteria III (UK, C4 (Noel Gay Television), Standup/sketch, colour) (1991)
Amnesty International's Big 30 (ITV (Working Title Television for Central), Standup/sketch (1991)
Dusty Springfield – Full Circle (BBC Interview/Documentary) (1994)
Alison Moyet – Whispering Your Name (promo video – Dawn appearance) (1994)
Dawn, a parody of Oprah-style chat-shows featuring Dawn French and Victoria Wood/ F&S Sketch (1995)

Comic Relief
Comic Relief (1988)
Comic Relief 2: A Night of Comic Relief 2 (1989)
Bananarama & Lananeeneenoonoo – Help! Promo video (Comic Relief single) (1989)
Bananarama & Lananeeneenoonoo – Help! Comic Relief '89 Live performance (1989)
Comic Relief '91: F&S and Birds of a Feather – Mistaken Identity (1991)
Comic Relief' 93: Total Relief (1993)
Comic Relief '95: The Night of Comic Relief (BBC, Sketch/standup) (1995)
Comic Relief '97 (1997)
Spice Girls & The Sugar Lumps – Who Do You Think You Are – Promo video (Comic Relief) (1997)
Comic Relief Special (Video Only) – The Extras On Doctor Who (unaired extended sketch recorded 13 years previously for series 1 episode 6 and eventually released as a short special as part of the Doctor Who Comic Relief video compilation) (2000)
Comic Relief Special – Harry Potter and The Secret Chamberpot of Azerbaijan (2003)
Comic Relief Special – Gimme, Gimme, Gimmick (Mamma Mia: The Movie) (13 March 2009)
Comic Relief Special – French and Saunders' Carpool Karaoke (24 March 2017)
Comic Relief Special - Mamma Mia! Here We Go YET Again (15 March 2019)
Comic Relief Special - French & Saunders and Dame Judi Dench visit The Repair Shop (March 18th, 2022)

References

External links

French and Saunders